The Liga Futsal 2010 is the premier futsal league in Brazil in the 15th edition. It is organized by the Brazilian Futsal Confederation (CBFS).

The Championship

First phase

Second phase

Group A

Group B

Quarterfinals

Semifinals

Final

External links
 Liga Fusal's official website
 Futsal Brasil Portal

Liga Nacional de Futsal
Liga
2010 in futsal